Reiss Butterworth (born 7 December 1998) is an English rugby league footballer who plays as a  for the Dewsbury Rams in the Championship.

He is a product of the Bradford Bulls Academy system and played for the Bradford Bulls in Betfred Championship

Background
Butterworth was born in Wakefield, West Yorkshire, England.

Playing career

Bradford Bulls
2017 - 2017 Season

Butterworth featured in 2017 pre-season friendlies against Huddersfield Giants and Keighley Cougars. He then featured in Round 20 and Round 21. Butterwoth also featured in the Championship Shield Game 5 against the Sheffield Eagles. Riess also played in the 2017 Challenge Cup in Round 4.

At the end of the season Butterworth signed a three year contract extension with the Bulls.

2018 - 2018 Season

Butterworth featured in the pre-season friendlies against Halifax R.L.F.C., Sheffield Eagles and Dewsbury Rams.

He was sent on loan to Batley Bulldogs for a month. Following his loan spell he was sent on loan to Castleford Tigers until the end of the season as part of a swap/loan deal for James Green.

Huddersfield
The young  spent most of his time out on loan with Batley Bulldogs, Castleford Tigers and, most recently, York City Knights for whom he scored against Rochdale Hornets in the 2020 Coral Challenge Cup.

Dewsbury Rams
On 28 November 2020, it was announced that Butterworth had signed for Dewsbury Rams

Statistics
Statistics do not include pre-season friendlies.

References

External links
Huddersfield Giants profile
Bradford Bulls profile
SL profile

Living people
1998 births
Batley Bulldogs players
Bradford Bulls players
Dewsbury Rams players
English rugby league players
Huddersfield Giants players
Rugby league hookers
Rugby league players from Wakefield
Rugby league second-rows
York City Knights players